Phillip Michael "Mickey" Marvin (October 5, 1955 – March 6, 2017) was a professional American football player.

Career
After attending the University of Tennessee, Marvin played in the National Football League (NFL) for 11 seasons, from 1977 to 1987, as an offensive guard with the Oakland/Los Angeles Raiders.  He was the starting right guard for the Raiders from 1978 to 1986, though playing only 2 games in 1979. With Dave Dalby and Gene Upshaw in 1980 and Dave Dalby and Charley Hannah in 1983, he helped solidify the middle of the offensive line which culminated in Raider wins of Super Bowl XV and Super Bowl XVIII. In the 1980 AFC championship game of the 1980–81 NFL playoffs, the Raiders beat the San Diego Chargers, rushing for 138 yards and passing for 261 yards. The Raiders then beat the Philadelphia Eagles in Super Bowl XV, rushing for a 117 yards and passing for 261 yards again, as Marvin outplayed Eagle nosetackle Charlie Johnson and inside linebackers Bill Bergey and Frank LeMaster. In the 1983 AFC championship game of the 1983–84 NFL playoffs, the Raiders beat the Seattle Seahawks, rushing for 205 yards and passing for 209 yards, as Marvin pushed around the nosetackle, Joe Nash, and the two inside linebackers Joe Norman and Keith Butler. The Raiders then beat the Washington Redskins in Super Bowl XVIII, rushing for a 231 yards and passing for 172 yards, as Marvin outmuscled the opposing defensive tackle, All-Pro Dave Butz.

Marvin died from amyotrophic lateral sclerosis, at the age of 61.

References

Lisa Marvin, Wife. Oakland Raiders Cheerleader

External links

 

1955 births
2017 deaths
People from Hendersonville, North Carolina
Tennessee Volunteers football players
Oakland Raiders players
Los Angeles Raiders players
American football offensive linemen
Players of American football from North Carolina
Neurological disease deaths in the United States
Deaths from motor neuron disease